Monica Zetterlund (born Eva Monica Nilsson; 20 September 1937 – 12 May 2005) was a Swedish jazz singer and actress. Through her lifetime, she  starred in over 10 Swedish film productions and recorded over 20 studio albums. She gained international fame through her collaborative album with Bill Evans, Waltz for Debby.

Career

Singer
Zetterlund began by learning the classic jazz songs from radio and records, initially not knowing the language and what they sang about in English. Her hit songs included "" (Swedish cover of "Walking My Baby Back Home"; in Swedish a tribute to Stockholm town), "Visa från Utanmyra", "", "", "" ("Little Green Apples"), "" ("Waltz for Debby"), "" ("Hit the Road Jack"), "", "", "" (cover of Sting's "Moon Over Bourbon Street") and "", among many others.

She also interpreted the works of such Swedish singer-songwriters as Evert Taube, Olle Adolphson and Povel Ramel, as well as international jazz musicians/songwriters. She worked with leading American players including Louis Armstrong, Bill Evans, Stan Getz, Steve Kuhn and Quincy Jones, and in the Scandinavian jazz world with people like Georg Riedel, Egil Johansen, Arne Domnérus, Svend Asmussen and Jan Johansson.

In 1964, she recorded the jazz album Waltz for Debby, featuring Bill Evans, a record she herself described as "the best I've done" and was the most proud of. Her professional skill was amply demonstrated in this album in performing the challenging Harold Arlen song, "So Long, Big Time".

Her long career also included the song "En gång i Stockholm" ("Once Upon a Time in Stockholm"); a jazz ballad with which she represented Sweden in the 1963 Eurovision Song Contest. She finished last, however (mainly because the song genre was not suitable for the competition) and scored nul points, but remained successful in Sweden.

Actor
Her collaboration with the comic duo Hasse & Tage (in the 1960s and 1970s) eventually led to a stage career in revues and films. Memorable are her parts in the films Att angöra en brygga and Äppelkriget, with her most memorable role being in Jan Troell's Utvandrarna (aka The Emigrants; with Liv Ullmann and Max von Sydow in the leads) as Ulrika, a former prostitute who together with her teenage daughter Elin (portrayed by Zetterlund's daughter, Eva Lena Zetterlund) join the main characters in their emigration to America in the 1850s, a role for which Zetterlund received a Guldbagge Award for Best Supporting Actress. She appeared in more than 20 films and television series.

Awards 
Zetterlund was awarded the Illis quorum by the government of Sweden in 2002.

Health and death
She suffered from severe scoliosis which began after a childhood accident, and as a result was forced to retire from performing in 1999.

On 12 May 2005, she died following an accidental fire in her apartment in Stockholm, probably due to her habit of smoking in bed.

Discography

Albums 
 Swedish Sensation (Columbia, 1958)
 Ahh! Monica! (Philips, 1962)
 Make Mine Swedish Style (Philips, 1964)
 Ohh! Monica! (Philips, 1964)
 Waltz for Debby with Bill Evans (Philips, 1964)
 Monica Zetterlund (Philips, 1967)
 Monica - Monica (Gazell 1971)
 Chicken Feathers (SR, 1972)
 Hej, Man! (Odeon, 1975)
 Folk Som Har Sånger Kan Inte Dö (YTF 1976)
 It Only Happens Every Time with Thad Jones/Mel Lewis Orchestra (Inner City, 1978)
 Holiday for Monica (Phontastic, 1983)
 Monica Zetterlund Sjunger Olle Adolphson (Phontastic, 1984)
 Monica Z (RCA, 1989)
 Varsamt (RCA, 1991)
 Topaz (RCA, 1993)
 The Lost Tapes at Bell Sound Studios NYC (RCA Victor, 1996)
 Det Finns Dagar (RCA, 1997)
 Bill Remembered: A Tribute to Bill Evans (RCA Victor, 2000)
 Diamanter (EMI, 2005)
 Sista Gången Du Var Med (National, 2006)
 På Café Katalin Torsdag 14 September 1989 (Gazell, 2006)
 På Berns 1964 (Vax, 2016)

Notable songs 
"Va' e' de' där" ("Dat Dere" with Swedish lyrics by Beppe Wolgers.)
"En gång i Stockholm"
"Sakta vi gå genom stan" ("Walkin' My Baby Back Home" with Swedish lyrics by Beppe Wolgers.)

Filmography
Swedish Portraits (Svenska bilder, 1964) as Mejram
Docking the Boat (Att angöra en brygga, 1965) as Berit
Night Games (Nattlek, 1966) as Lotten
The Emigrants (Utvandrarna, 1971) as Ulrika
The Apple War (Äppelkriget, 1971) as Anna Lindberg
The New Land (Nybyggarna, 1972) as Erika
Stubby, (Fimpen, 1974) as Teacher
Guttersnipes (Rännstensungar, 1974) as Malinda Karlsson
Sweden for the Swedes (Sverige åt svenskarna, 1980) as Minister of finance
The Children from Blue Lake Mountain (Barnen från Blåsjöfjället, 1980)  as Hulda Krok
Russian Pizza Blues (1992) as Herself

References

Further reading

External links

 – official site (Monica Zetterlund Society & Memory Fund] (in Swedish)

Monica Zetterlund article reporting her death at Aftonbladet.se (in Swedish)

1937 births
2005 deaths
People from Hagfors
Swedish jazz singers
Eurovision Song Contest entrants for Sweden
Eurovision Song Contest entrants of 1963
Melodifestivalen contestants
Melodifestivalen winners
Philips Records artists
Swedish film actresses
Accidental deaths in Sweden
Deaths from fire
Best Actress Guldbagge Award winners
20th-century Swedish women singers
Recipients of the Illis quorum